Tay Seow Huah (1932/1933 – September 1980) was a Singaporean senior civil servant who served at various times as Director of the Special Branch, Director of the Security and Intelligence Division, Permanent Secretary for Home Affairs and Permanent Secretary for Defence, prior to his retirement in 1976. 

He was awarded the Meritorious Service Award in 1967, and the Eisenhower Fellowships in 1971. He was Acting Permanent Secretary of Home Affairs around 1971 and was involved in the Laju incident. 

He died in September 1980, at the age of 47.

In December 2000, the Tay Seow Huah Book Prize was set up by his children, Joanne Tay Siok Wan and Simon Tay Seong Chee, and a small group of relatives, friends and former colleagues, including President S. R. Nathan.

References

External links
 S. Rajaratnam School of International Studies Master of Science - Gold Medal and Prizes

1980 deaths
Singaporean civil servants
Permanent secretaries of Singapore
Singaporean people of Chinese descent
Terrorism in Singapore
Year of birth uncertain